Tricolia is a genus of sea snails, marine gastropod mollusks in the subfamily Tricoliinae of the family Phasianellidae.

This genus formerly belonged to the family Tricoliidae.

Description
This genus consists of small species with a head without frontal lobes. The shell is ovate, elongated, and imperforate. The radula has a broad, simple median tooth, overlying the bases of the inner laterals. These are subrhomboidal, produced at their outer angles into wings which overlie the bases of the adjacent tooth outward, and have denticulate cusps. The outer lateral is narrow, not produced on the outer angle. The marginal teeth have long simple cusps, The columella is smooth, arcuate, and not dentate.

Distribution
The species occurs in all tropical and subtropical seas.

Species
Species within the genus Tricolia include:

 Tricolia adusta Nangammbi & Herbert, 2006
 Tricolia algoidea (Pallary, 1920)
 Tricolia bicarinata Dunker, 1846
 Tricolia capensis (Dunker, 1846)
 Tricolia delicata Poppe, Tagaro & Goto, 2018
 Tricolia deschampsi Gofas, 1993
 † Tricolia dissimilis (Deshayes, 1863) 
 † Tricolia dunkeri (Deshayes, 1863) 
 Tricolia elongata (Krauss, 1848) 
 Tricolia entomocheila Gofas, 1993
 Tricolia fordiana (Pilsbry, 1888)
 Tricolia formosa (W. H. Turton, 1932)
 Tricolia gabiniana (Cotton & Godfrey, 1938)
 † Tricolia herouvalensis (Cossmann, 1888)
 Tricolia indica Winckworth, 1940
 Tricolia insignis (Turton, 1932) 
 Tricolia ios Robertson, 1985
 Tricolia kochii (Philippi, 1848)
 † Tricolia laevis (Defrance, 1826) 
 † Tricolia lamarckiana (Deshayes, 1863) 
 Tricolia landinii Bogi & Campani, 2007
 † Tricolia laubrierei (Cossmann, 1888) 
 Tricolia milaschewitchi Anistratenko & Starobogatov, 1991
 Tricolia miniata (Monterosato, 1884)
 Tricolia munieri (Vélain, 1877)
 Tricolia neritina (Dunker, 1846)
 Tricolia nordsiecki (Talavera, 1978)
 Tricolia petiti (Craven, 1882)
 Tricolia pullus (Linnaeus, 1758)
 Tricolia punctura Gofas, 1993
 Tricolia retrolineata Nangammbi & Herbert, 2008
 Tricolia rosea (Angas, 1867)
 Tricolia saxatilis Nangammbi & Herbert, 2006
 † Tricolia semistriata (Lamarck, 1804) 
 Tricolia speciosa (Mühlfeld, 1824)
 Tricolia striolata (W. H. Turton, 1932)
 † Tricolia succinaeopsis (Cossmann, 1888) 
 † Tricolia suessoniensis (Deshayes, 1863) 
 Tricolia tenuis (Michaud, 1829)
 † Tricolia tenuistriata (Deshayes, 1863) 
 Tricolia tingitana Gofas, 1982
 Tricolia tomlini (Gatliff & Gabriel, 1921)
 Tricolia tristis (Pilsbry 1903)
 † Tricolia turbinoides (Lamarck, 1804) †
 † Tricolia vasseuri (Cossmann, 1902) 

Species brought into synonymy 
 Tricolia adamsi (Philippi, 1853): synonym of Eulithidium adamsi (Philippi, 1853)
 Tricolia affinis (C. B. Adams, 1850): synonym of  Eulithidium affine (C. B. Adams, 1850)
 Tricolia affinis beaui Robertson, 1958: synonym of Eulithidium beaui (Robertson, 1958)
 Tricolia alfredensis (Turton, 1932): synonym of Tricolia elongata (Krauss, 1848)
 Tricolia beaui Robertson, 1958: synonym of Eulithidium beaui (Robertson, 1958)
 Tricolia bella (M. Smith, 1937): synonym of Eulithidium bellum (M. Smith, 1937)
 Tricolia bellum M. Smith, 1937: synonym of Eulithidium bellum (M. Smith, 1937)
 Tricolia breve d'Orbigny, 1842: synonym of Eulithidium breve (d'Orbigny, 1842) [nomen dubium]
 Tricolia brongniartii Audouin, 1826: synonym of Phasianella solida (Born, 1778)
 Tricolia bryani Pilsbry, H.A., 1917: synonym of Tricolia variabilis (Pease, 1861) 
 Tricolia compta (Gould, 1855): synonym of Eulithidium comptum (Gould, 1855) 
 Tricolia cruenta Robertson, 1958: synonym of Eulithidium affine (C. B. Adams, 1850) 
 Tricolia cyclostoma (Carpenter, 1864): synonym of Eulithidium cyclostoma (Carpenter, 1864)
 Tricolia diantha McLean, 1970: synonym of Eulithidium diantha (McLean, 1970)
 Tricolia draparnaudi Audouin, 1826: synonym of Echinolittorina punctata (Gmelin, 1791)
 Tricolia guerini Audouin, 1826: synonym of Phasianella solida (Born, 1778)
 Tricolia kraussi E.A. Smith, 1911:synonym of Tricolia bicarinata (Dunker, 1846)
 Tricolia macleani Marincovich, 1973: synonym of Eulithidium macleani (Marincovich, 1973) 
 Tricolia megastoma Pilsbry, H.A., 1895: synonym of Tricolia variabilis (Pease, 1861) 
 Tricolia molokaiensis Pilsbry, H.A., 1917: synonym of Tricolia variabilis (Pease, 1861) 
 Tricolia nicaeensis Risso 1826: synonym of Tricolia speciosa (Mühlfeld, 1824) 
 Tricolia oligomphala (Pilsbry, 1895): synonym of Tricolia variabilis (Pease, 1861)
 Tricolia perforata (Philippi, 1848): synonym of Eulithidium perforatum (Philippi, 1848)
 Tricolia phasianella (Philippi, 1849): synonym of Eulithidium phasianella (Philippi, 1849)
 Tricolia picta (da Costa, 1778): synonym of Tricolia pullus picta (da Costa, 1778)
 Tricolia pterocladia sic: synonym of Eulithidium pterocladicum (Robertson, 1958) 
 Tricolia pterocladica Robertson, 1958: synonym of Eulithidium pterocladicum (Robertson, 1958) 
 Tricolia pulchella (Récluz, 1843): synonym of Eulithidium bellum (M. Smith, 1937)
 Tricolia pulloides (Carpenter, 1865): synonym of Eulithidium pulloides (Carpenter, 1865)
 Tricolia rentneri Nordsieck 1973: synonym of Tricolia speciosa (Mühlfeld, 1824) 
 Tricolia rissoi Audouin, 1826: synonym of Melarhaphe neritoides (Linnaeus, 1758)
 Tricolia rubra Risso 1826: synonym of Tricolia speciosa (Mühlfeld, 1824) 
 Tricolia speciosa var. seriopunctata Monterosato 1884: synonym of Tricolia speciosa (Mühlfeld, 1824) 
 Tricolia speciosa var. virescens Monterosato 1884: synonym of Tricolia speciosa (Mühlfeld, 1824)
 Tricolia substriata (Carpenter, 1864): synonym of Eulithidium substriatum (P. P. Carpenter, 1864)
 Tricolia tessellata (Potiez & Michaud, 1838): synonym of Eulithidium tessellatum (Potiez & Michaud, 1838)
 Tricolia tessellata auct. non Potiez & Michaud, 1838: synonym of Eulithidium pterocladicum (Robertson, 1958) 
 Tricolia tesselata auct. non C. B. Adams, 1850: synonym of Eulithidium thalassicola (Robertson, 1958)
 Tricolia thalassicola Robertson, 1958: synonym of Eulithidium thalassicola (Robertson, 1958)
 Tricolia thaanumi Pilsbry, H.A., 1917: synonym of Tricolia variabilis (Pease, 1861) 
 Tricolia tricolor (Monterosato in Bucquoy, Dautzenberg & Dollfus, 1884): synonym of Tricolia pullus (Linnaeus, 1758)
 Tricolia tropidophora Tomlin, 1931: synonym of Tricolia bicarinata (Dunker, 1846)
 Tricolia umbilicata (d'Orbigny, 1840): synonym of Eulithidium umbilicatum (d'Orbigny, 1840)
 Tricolia variabilis (Pease, 1860): synonym of Hiloa variabilis (Pease, 1861)
 Tricolia variegata (Carpenter, 1864): synonym of Eulithidium variegatum (Carpenter, 1864)
 Tricolia virgo Angas, G.F., 1867: synonym of Tricolia variabilis (Pease, 1861)

References

 Monterosato T. A. (di) (1884). Nomenclatura generica e specifica di alcune conchiglie mediterranee. Palermo, Virzi, 152 pp.,, p. 50
 Smith E.A. (1911). On a new species of Phasianella from South Africa. Proc. Malac. Soc, vol. 9, pt. 5, pp. 313–314
 Gofas S. (1982). The genus Tricolia in the Eastern Atlantic and the Mediterranean. Journal of Molluscan Studies 48: 182-213
 Vaught, K.C. (1989). A classification of the living Mollusca. American Malacologists: Melbourne, FL (USA). . XII, 195 pp
 Gofas, S.; Le Renard, J.; Bouchet, P. (2001). Mollusca, in: Costello, M.J. et al. (Ed.) (2001). European register of marine species: a check-list of the marine species in Europe and a bibliography of guides to their identification. Collection Patrimoines Naturels, 50: pp. 180–213
 Williams, S.T., Karube, S. & Ozawa, T. (2008) Molecular systematics of Vetigastropoda: Trochidae, Turbinidae and Trochoidea redefined. Zoologica Scripta 37, 483–506

Phasianellidae
Gastropod genera